Hyperflex may refer to:
Flexion, in anatomy
Inflection point of a curve where the tangent meets to order at least 4, in mathematics